136th meridian may refer to:

136th  meridian east, a line of longitude east of the Greenwich Meridian
136th meridian west, a line of longitude west of the Greenwich Meridian